Journal of Cross-Cultural Psychology is a peer-reviewed academic journal that publishes papers in the field of cross-cultural psychology. The journal's editor is Deborah L. Best (Wake Forest University). It has been in publication since 1970 and is currently published by SAGE Publications.

Abstracting and indexing 
Journal of Cross-Cultural Psychology is abstracted and indexed in among other databases:  SCOPUS, and the Social Sciences Citation Index. According to the Journal Citation Reports, its 2020 impact factor is 2.618, ranking it 36 out of 66 journals in the category 'Psychology, Social'.

See also 
 International Association for Cross-Cultural Psychology

References

External links 
 

SAGE Publishing academic journals
English-language journals
Publications established in 1970
Cross-cultural psychology
Cultural psychology journals
10 times per year journals